Imbrication is the arrangement of planar bodies such that they stack in a consistent fashion - rather like a toppled run of dominoes.

In roofing, imbrication is employed in the Imbrex and tegula system.
Imbrication (sedimentology).
Imbrication (linguistics),  a morphophonological phenomenon